Supposed to Be may refer to:
 song by Icon for Hire, 2016
 song by Hayley Kiyoko from the album Panorama, 2022